Frank Stokes may refer to:

 Frank Stokes (musician) (1888–1955), American blues musician, songster, and blackface minstrel
 Frank Stokes (footballer) (1881–1945), English professional footballer
 Frank Wilbert Stokes (1858–1955), American sketch artist and painter

See also

 Francis Stokes